The Ayrshire (IPA ) is a Scottish breed of dairy cattle. It originates in, and is named for, the county of Ayrshire in south-western Scotland. Ayrshires typically have red and white markings; the red can range from a shade of orange to a dark brown.

History 

The origins of the Ayrshire are not known. It originated in the county of Ayrshire in Scotland before 1800. It was variously known as the Dunlop, later the Cunningham, and finally, the Ayrshire. These are all parts of the County Ayr.
Although they are now native to Ayrshire, Scotland, some historians believe the Ayrshire breed originated in Holland. In 1750, they were crossbred with other breeds of cattle, which led to their distinctive brown spots. The cattle were recognised as a distinct breed by the Highland and Agricultural Society in 1814. Many modern dairy farmers favour Ayrshires because of their longevity, hardiness, and easy calving. These traits are thought to have developed due to the rugged conditions of its native habitat.

The Ayrshire was exported to the United States from 1822, primarily to Connecticut and other parts of New England. The environment was similar to their native land of Scotland. The American Ayrshire Breed Association was founded in 1875. The Approved Ayrshire Milk programme, which licensed farms that owned Ayrshire cattle, began in the 1930s. Ayrshire milk was identified as being of higher quality compared to that of other breeds. Today, the cattle are owned by farmers in many areas of America, including New York and Pennsylvania.

Characteristics 

The Ayrshire is a medium-sized breed. Their milk production can reach  or greater per annum.

The cattle are usually red and white in colour, the red varying from very deep to a lighter shade. The cattle are typically strong and adaptable to many farming methods, and better suited to extensive management than breeds such as the Friesian.

Temperament
A study of the social behaviour of Polish Black-and-White dairy cattle and their F1-crossbreds with Ayrshire, Jersey, Holstein-Friesian and Swedish Black-and-White breeds, found the Ayrshire crossbreeds were most dominant, least attacked by their group-mates and least susceptible to a group change.  A further study found that among Ayrshire, Holstein, Jersey, Brown Swiss and Guernsey (the other common dairy breeds), the Ayrshire had the highest number of agonistic interactions, however, this was not related to bodyweight.

Population 
In 2008, 63,356 Ayrshire cattle were registered in the United Kingdom. In the United States, Ayrshire cattle are classed as a "recovering" breed by the Livestock Conservancy, despite a significant decline in registrations over the last 30 years. This means more than 2,500 registrations occur annually, but the breed is "still in need of monitoring."

References

External links 

 U.S. Ayrshire Breeders Association
 Ayrshire Cattle Society of Great Britain and Ireland

Dairy cattle breeds
Cattle breeds originating in Scotland
Conservation Priority Breeds of the Livestock Conservancy